Associação Desportiva de Grijó (abbreviated as AD Grijó) is a Portuguese football club based in Grijó, Vila Nova de Gaia in the district of Porto.

Background
AD Grijó currently plays in the Terceira Divisão Série B which is the fourth tier of Portuguese football. The club was founded in 1960 and they play their home matches at the Estádio Municipal de Grijó in Grijó, Vila Nova de Gaia. The stadium is able to accommodate 500 spectators.

The club is affiliated to Associação de Futebol do Porto and has competed in the AF Porto Taça. The club has also entered the national cup competition known as Taça de Portugal on a few occasions.

Season to season

Honours
AF Porto 1ª Divisão: 2007/08

Footnotes

External links
Official website 

Football clubs in Portugal
Association football clubs established in 1960
1960 establishments in Portugal